Chino 'Fats' Williams (July 26, 1933 – April 5, 2000) was an American actor.

Williams was best known for such films and television series as The Terminator, Action Jackson, Road House, Rocky III, Weird Science, Iron Eagle, Storyville, House Party, and Baretta.

Chino Williams' last film appearance was the 1996 film Killin' Me Softly. Williams died at the age of 66 due to complications from kidney failure that had occurred years earlier.

Filmography
The Gravy Train (1974) - Chicken Man (uncredited)
Rocky (1976) - Man in unemployment line (uncredited)
Rocky II (1979) - Job searcher (uncredited)
Defiance (1980) - Local #2
Rocky III (1982) - Derelict
Swing Shift (1984) - Bouncer at Kelly's
The Terminator (1984) - Truck Driver
Weird Science (1985) - Bar Patron 
Iron Eagle (1986) - Slappy
Wildcats (1986) - Poolhall Man #2
Jumpin' Jack Flash (1986) - Larry (The Heavyset Guard)
Planes, Trains and Automobiles (1987) - Marathon Shuttle Driver (uncredited)
Action Jackson (1988) - Kid Sable
Hot to Trot (1988) - Messenger
Road House (1989) - Derelict
House Party (1990) - Fats 
Secret Agent OO Soul (1990) - Owner of Bertha's Cafe
Talkin' Dirty After Dark (1991) - Club Patron
Bébé's Kids (1992) - Card Player #2 (voice)
Storyville (1992) - Theotis Washington
Killin' Me Softly (1996) - Uncle Wesley (final film role)

References

External links

1933 births
2000 deaths
American male film actors
American male television actors
African-American male actors
20th-century American male actors
20th-century African-American people